GSF Explorer, formerly USNS Hughes Glomar Explorer (T-AG-193), was a deep-sea drillship platform built for Project Azorian, the secret 1974 effort by the United States Central Intelligence Agency's Special Activities Division to recover the Soviet submarine K-129.

Construction

Hughes told the media that the ship's purpose was to extract manganese nodules from the ocean floor. This marine geology cover story became surprisingly influential, causing many others to examine the idea.

Project Azorian

The Soviet diesel-electric submarine K-129 sank in the Pacific Ocean  NW of Hawaii, on 8 March 1968.  The USS Halibut identified the wreck site and the CIA crafted an elaborate and highly secret plan to recover the submarine for intelligence purposes.  As K-129 had sunk in very deep water, at a depth of 16,500 feet, a large ship was required for the recovery operation. Such a vessel would be detected easily by Soviet vessels, which might then interfere with the operation, so an elaborate cover story was developed.  The CIA contacted Hughes, who agreed to help.

In 1974, the ship recovered a portion of K-129, but as the section was being lifted to the surface, a mechanical failure in the grapple caused two-thirds of the recovered section to break off. This lost section is said to have held many of the most-sought items, including the code book and nuclear missiles. The recovered section held two nuclear-tipped torpedoes and some cryptographic machines, along with the bodies of six Soviet submariners, who were given a formal, filmed burial at sea.

The operation became public in February 1975 when the Los Angeles Times published a story about "Project Jennifer". Other news organizations, including The New York Times, added details. The CIA declined to either confirm or deny the reports, a tactic that became known as the Glomar response and subsequently used to confront all manner of journalistic and public inquiry, including Freedom of Information Act requests. The actual name, Project Azorian, became public only in 2010.

The publication Red Star Rogue (2005) by Kenneth Sewell claims "Project Jennifer" recovered virtually all of K-129 from the ocean floor.  Sewell states, "[D]espite an elaborate cover-up and the eventual claim that Project Jennifer had been a failure, most of K-129 and the remains of the crew were, in fact, raised from the bottom of the Pacific and brought into the Glomar Explorer".

A subsequent movie and book by Michael White and Norman Polmar (Project Azorian: The CIA and the Raising of the K-129) revealed testimony from on-site crewmen as well as B&W video of the actual recovery operation. These sources indicate that only the forward  of the submarine were recovered.

After Project Azorian

Mothballing

While the ship had an enormous lifting capacity, there was little interest in operating the vessel because of her great cost. From March to June 1976, the General Services Administration (GSA) published advertisements inviting businesses to submit proposals for leasing the ship. By the end of four months, GSA had received a total of seven bids, including a US$2 offer submitted by Braden Ryan, a Lincoln, Nebraska college student, and a US$1.98 million offer ($ million in ) from a man who said he planned to seek a government contract to salvage the nuclear reactors of two United States submarines.  The Lockheed Missile and Space Company submitted a US$3 million ($ million in ), two-year lease proposal contingent upon the company's ability to secure financing.  GSA had already extended the bid deadline twice to allow Lockheed to find financial backers for its project without success and the agency concluded there was no reason to believe this would change during the near future.

Although the scientific community rallied to the defense of Hughes Glomar Explorer, urging the president to  maintain the ship as a national asset, no agency or department of the government wanted to assume the maintenance and operating cost. Subsequently, during September 1976, the GSA transferred Hughes Glomar Explorer to the Navy for storage, and during January 1977, after it was prepared for dry docking at a cost of more than two million dollars, the ship became part of the Navy's Suisun Bay Reserve Fleet.

Lease, sale and disposal
In September 1978, Ocean Minerals Company consortium of Mountain View, California, announced it had leased Hughes Glomar Explorer and that in November would begin testing a prototype deep-sea mining system in the Pacific Ocean. The consortium included subsidiaries of the Standard Oil Company of Indiana, Royal Dutch Shell, and Boskalis Westminster Group NV of the Netherlands. The consortium's prime contractor was the Lockheed Missiles and Space Company.

In late 1996, the ship was towed from the mothball fleet in Suisun Bay to San Francisco Bay, where much of the existing rig structure around the moon pool, including the massive gimbal was removed.  Following this, she was towed North to Portland, Oregon, for drydocking, closing up much of the submarine-sized moonpool, and engine repairs, among other things.

The conversion cost more than $180 million ($ million in ) and was completed during the first quarter of 1998.

The conversion of the vessel from 1996–1998 was the start of a 30-year lease from the U.S. Navy to Global Marine Drilling at a cost of US$1 million per year ($ million per year in ). Global Marine merged with Santa Fe International Corporation during 2001 to become GlobalSantaFe Corporation, which merged with Transocean in November 2007 and operated the vessel as GSF Explorer.

The vessel was reflagged from Houston to Port Vila, Vanuatu, in the third quarter of 2013.

During her 18-year drilling career, she worked in the Gulf Of Mexico, Nigeria, the Black Sea, Angola, Indonesia and India, with various shipyards and port visits along the way, with numerous oil company clients.  Crew members fondly referred to her as "The Mothership".

Transocean announced in April 2015 that the ship would be scrapped. The ship arrived at the ship breakers at Zhoushan, China, on June 5, 2015.

See also
 Hughes Mining Barge
 Special Activities Division

References

Notes

Citations

Bibliography

 Burleson, Clyde W. The Jennifer Project. College Station, Texas: Texas A&M University Press, 1997. .
 DeLuca, Marshall and William Furlow, eds. "Steeped in history, Glomar Explorer finally returns to industry, Converted vessel set to drill in record water depth." Offshore magazine, Volume 58, Issue 3, March 1998.
 Dunham, Roger C. Spy Sub: Top Secret Mission To The Bottom Of The Pacific. New York: Penguin Books, 1996.   .
 Podvig, Pavel, ed. Russian Strategic Nuclear Forces. Stanford, CA: Stanford University, 2001. . (originally published by Center for Arms Control Studies, Moscow Institute of Physics and Technology)
 Polmar, Norman & Michael White. PROJECT AZORIAN-The CIA and the Raising of the K-129.  Naval Institute Press. 2010. .
 Sewell, Kenneth. Red Star Rogue: The Untold Story of a Soviet Submarine's Nuclear Strike Attempt on the U.S. New York: Simon & Schuster, 2005. .
 
 Sontag, Sherry, Christopher Drew with Annette Lawrence Drew. Blind Man's Bluff: The Untold Story of American Submarine Espionage. New York: Harper, 1998. .
 Varner, Roy and Wayne Collier. A Matter of Risk: The Incredible Inside Story of the CIA's Hughes Glomar Explorer Mission to Raise a Russian Submarine.'' New York: Random House,  1978. .

External links

 
 AZORIAN The Raising of the K-129 / 2009 - 2 Part TV Documentary / Michael White Films Vienna
 Transocean, Inc.
 New life as a Global Drilling
 Images of the ship
 Images of HMB-1, the Hughes mining barge which held the recovery claw
 Project overview
 Overview of Project Jennifer
 Virtual tour inside HMB-1 and Sea Shadow, 2011, includes HMB-1 operating manual.
 Glomar Explorer Technical Description
 The secret on the ocean floor, BBC (2018).

K-129 submarine sinking accident
Howard Hughes
1972 ships
Cold War auxiliary ships of the United States
Miscellaneous auxiliaries of the United States Navy
Drillships
Ships built by the Sun Shipbuilding & Drydock Company
Transocean